Savkino is a rural locality (a village) in Sosnovskoye Rural Settlement, Vologodsky District, Vologda Oblast, Russia. The population was 12 as of 2002.

Geography 
Savkino is located 24 km west of Vologda (the district's administrative centre) by road. Babtsyno is the nearest rural locality.

References 

Rural localities in Vologodsky District